Lamar Leachman (August 7, 1932 – October 27, 2012) was an American football coach. He served as an assistant coach for the Toronto Argonauts, Montreal Alouettes, New York Giants and Detroit Lions. He was the defensive line coach when the Giants won Super Bowl XXI.

He died on October 27, 2012, in Myrtle Beach, South Carolina at age 80. His death from chronic traumatic encephalopathy (CTE) was chronicled in The King of Halloween and Miss Firecracker Queen: A Daughter's Tale of Family and Football, a 2018 memoir about growing up in the South with a football coach father authored by Duke University economics professor Lori Leachman.

References

1932 births
2012 deaths
American football centers
Tennessee Volunteers football players
Calgary Stampeders players
Richmond Spiders football coaches
Georgia Tech Yellow Jackets football coaches
Memphis Tigers football coaches
South Carolina Gamecocks football coaches
Toronto Argonauts coaches
Montreal Alouettes coaches
New York Giants coaches
Detroit Lions coaches